The 2021 Pan Am Badminton Championships are the 24th tournament of the Pan American Badminton Championships held in Guatemala City, Guatemala, from April 28 to May 2, 2021.

Tournament 
The 2021 Pan Am Badminton Championships is the 24th edition of the championships. This tournament is organized by the Badminton Federation of Guatemala and sanctioned by the BWF. The tournament consist of men's (singles and doubles), women's (singles and doubles), and also mixed doubles.

Point distribution
Below is the tables with the point distribution for each phase of the tournament based on the BWF points system for the Pan American Badminton Championships, which is equivalent to a Super 300 event.

Medal summary

Medalists

Medal table

Men's singles

Seeds 

 Jason Ho-Shue (final)
 Brian Yang (champions)
 Ygor Coelho (quarter-finals)
 Kevin Cordón (semi-finals)
 Lino Muñoz (quarter-finals)
 B. R. Sankeerth (semi-finals)
 Timothy Lam (quarter-finals)
 Osleni Guerrero (withdrew)

Finals

Top half

Section 1

Section 2

Bottom half

Section 3

Section 4

Women's singles

Seeds 

 Beiwen Zhang (champions)
 Iris Wang (semi-finals)
 Fabiana Silva (withdrew)
 Daniela Macías  (second round)

Finals

Top half

Section 1

Section 2

Bottom half

Section 3

Section 4

Men's doubles

Seeds 

 Jason Ho-Shue / Nyl Yakura (final)
 Phillip Chew / Ryan Chew (champions)

Finals

Top half

Bottom half

Women's doubles

Seeds 

 Rachel Honderich / Kristen Tsai (champions)
 Daniela Macías / Dánica Nishimura (withdrew)

Finals

Top half

Bottom half

Mixed doubles

Seeds 

 Joshua Hurlburt-Yu / Josephine Wu (champions)
 Mathew Fogarty / Isabel Zhong (second round)
 Jonathan Solís / Diana Corleto (semi-finals)
 Diego Mini / Dánica Nishimura (withdrew)

Finals

Top half

Section 1

Section 2

Bottom half

Section 3

Section 4

References

External links 
Tournament link

2021
Pan Am Badminton Championships
International sports competitions hosted by Guatemala
Pan Am Badminton Championships
Pan Am Badminton Championships
Pan Am Badminton Championships
Badminton tournaments in Guatemala